Silver Spring station (listed as the Silver Spring Baltimore and Ohio Railroad Station on the National Register of Historic Places) is a former train station on the Metropolitan Subdivision in Silver Spring in Montgomery County, Maryland. It was built in 1945 by the Baltimore and Ohio Railroad on the foundation of a previous station, a Victorian-style brick structure built in 1878. It served intercity trains until 1986 and light rail until 2000. Today, it is owned and operated as a museum by Montgomery Preservation, Inc., a non-profit organization.

History 
The station was designed in the Colonial Revival style and built from standardized plans developed for B&O stations in the mid-1940s. 

In the Baltimore & Ohio era, the station was the first stop out of Washington on westbound long-distance trains. The roster in 1956 included:
Ambassador (Baltimore-Detroit)
Capitol Limited (Jersey City-Chicago)
Cleveland Night Express (Baltimore-Cleveland)
Columbian (Washington-Chicago)
Diplomat (Jersey City-St. Louis)
Metropolitan Special (Jersey City-St. Louis)
National Limited (Jersey City-St. Louis)
Shenandoah (Jersey City-Chicago)
Washington-Chicago Express (Washington-Chicago)

Amtrak's Blue Ridge to Cumberland served the station from 1973 until it was discontinued in 1986.

MARC Brunswick Line service at the station ended in 2000, and trains now stop at nearby Silver Spring station where transfer to the Washington Metro is available. 

The station was added to the National Register of Historic Places in 2000 and restored in 2002. It retains its original 1940s waiting-room furniture and recessed fluorescent lighting fixtures. Exhibits on the history of Silver Spring and the B&O Station are provided by the Silver Spring Historical Society and Montgomery Preservation. 

The Eastbound Waiting Room, a small rectangular building of similar design, stood on the south side of the tracks. Built along with the station in 1945, it was razed and rebuilt in 1976 to make way for tracks laid for the Washington Metro. An underground pedestrian tunnel connected the two buildings beneath the track bed. In 2008, the building was demolished to make way for other development.

References

External links

, including photo in 2004, at Maryland Historical Trust website
Silver Spring Baltimore and Ohio Railroad Station - Information from the Town of Silver Spring

Downtown Silver Spring, Maryland
Railway stations in the United States opened in 1878
Railway stations closed in 2000
Railway stations on the National Register of Historic Places in Maryland
Railway stations in the United States opened in 1945
Railway stations in Montgomery County, Maryland
Former Baltimore and Ohio Railroad stations
Colonial Revival architecture in Maryland
Former Amtrak stations in Maryland
1878 establishments in Maryland
National Register of Historic Places in Montgomery County, Maryland
2000 disestablishments in Maryland